Patrick Buteux van der Kamp (born 9 October 1937) is a Dutch former field hockey player. He competed in the men's tournament at the 1960 Summer Olympics.

References

External links
 

1937 births
Living people
Dutch male field hockey players
Olympic field hockey players of the Netherlands
Field hockey players at the 1960 Summer Olympics
Field hockey players from The Hague
20th-century Dutch people